The men's 20 kilometres race walk at the 1978 European Athletics Championships was held in Prague, then Czechoslovakia, on 30 August 1978.

Medalists

Results

Final
30 August

Participation
According to an unofficial count, 29 athletes from 14 countries participated in the event.

 (1)
 (3)
 (3)
 (2)
 (1)
 (3)
 (1)
 (2)
 (2)
 (3)
 (1)
 (3)
 (3)
 (1)

References

20 kilometres race walk
Racewalking at the European Athletics Championships